The Voice UK is a British television music competition to find new singing talent. The second series was hosted by Holly Willoughby and Reggie Yates on BBC One and started on 30 March 2013. On 13 November 2012, it was confirmed that all four coaches from last year would return. The show's Blind Auditions moved to dock10, MediaCityUK in Salford, Greater Manchester. It was also confirmed that the live show format would be tweaked for this series, which included the cutback from six live shows in the first series to only three live shows, and the pre-recorded results show had also been dropped, with the results given on the same night as the performances. On 28 February 2013, four ten-second teaser trailers were posted to the show's official website and YouTube page.

The series was won by Andrea Begley from Team Danny on 22 June 2013.

This was the final series to feature Jessie J and Danny O'Donoghue as coaches, and Holly Willoughby and Reggie Yates as co-presenters.

Coaches

In the summer of 2012, it was reported that Jessie J and Sir Tom Jones were in talks to leave the series, with Cheryl and Cliff Richard lined up to replace them. Despite these claims, in November 2012, it was confirmed that will.i.am, Jessie J, Jones and Danny O'Donoghue would all be returning for the second series. This is the final series to see Jessie J and Danny O' Donoghue in The Voice UK, as both left the show before the 2014 series.

Holly Willoughby and Reggie Yates both confirmed that they would be returning for their second series as presenters in November 2012.

Teams
The teams were revealed during the 4 May 2013 episode of the blind auditions.

Colour key

Blind auditions
The blind auditions began in Salford, Greater Manchester on 14 December 2012 at dock10, MediaCityUK after moving from BBC Television Centre in London. Each coach had the length of the artists' performance to decide if they wanted that artist on their team. Should two or more coaches have wanted the same artist, then the artist chose their coach. Once the coaches picked their team, they pitted them against each other in the battles.

Episode 1 (30 March)
The 95-minute first blind audition episode was broadcast on 30 March 2013 and aired from 7.00pm until 8.35pm.

Group performance: The Voice UK coaches – Medley of "Rip It Up" / "Johnny B. Goode"/ "Shout" / "Long Tall Sally"

Episode 2 (6 April)
The 90-minute second episode was broadcast on 6 April 2013 and aired from 7.00pm until 8.30pm.

Episode 3 (13 April)
The 90-minute third episode was broadcast on 13 April 2013 and aired from 6.45pm until 8.15pm.

Episode 4 (20 April)
The 65-minute fourth episode was broadcast on 20 April 2013 and aired from 8.20pm until 9.25pm.

Episode 5 (27 April)
The 85-minute fifth episode was broadcast on 27 April 2013 and aired from 8.05pm until 9.25pm.

Episode 6 (4 May)
The 80-minute sixth episode was broadcast on 4 May 2013 from 8.05pm until 9.25pm.

Battle rounds
The recording of the battle rounds took place on 9 and 10 February 2013 at The Fountain Studios and aired on 11, 12 and 25 May 2013. This year's battle rounds featured a new "steal" twist. After each battle round the losing artist then pitched to the other three coaches on why they should join their team. It was then up to the coaches (who have a limited amount of time) to press their red button to steal the artist. They could press their button as many times as they liked but were only allowed to steal one artist. If more than one coach wanted to steal the same artist then it was up to the artist to decide which team to join. The first battle rounds episode aired from 8.35pm until 9.50pm, the second aired on from 7.00pm until 8.00pm and the third ran for 130 minutes from 7.10pm until 9.20pm (There was no episode on 18 May due to the Eurovision Song Contest).

The battle round advisors were will.i.am working with Dante Santiago, Jessie J with Claude Kelly, Tom Jones with Cerys Matthews and Danny O'Donoghue with Dido.

Colour key

Knockout rounds
The recording of the knockout rounds took place at The Fountain Studios on 21 February 2013 and aired on 1 and 2 June 2013. Before each knockout round, the coach chose one artist from their team to get a "fast pass" to the live shows, the remaining six artists from that team were then split up into two groups of three. At the end of each knockout round the coach then decided out of the three artists who won, and therefore made up their three artists to take to the live shows. Episode 1 aired from 8.30pm until 9.40pm, while episode 2 aired from 7.15pm until 8.30pm.

Colour key:

Live shows
The live performance shows were aired live from Pinewood Studios and ran for three consecutive weeks, beginning on 7 June 2013. The BBC decided to move the first live show to Friday 7 June to avoid a clash with the Britain's Got Talent final on Saturday 8 June, and the live coverage of the 2013 Canadian Grand Prix on BBC One prevented alternative air dates over the weekend. However, the remaining two live shows still aired on 15 and 22 June 2013.

Jessie J performed her latest single "Wild" on the Final Live Show. The first live show featured a medley of performances from the previous year's winner and finalists, Leanne Mitchell, Bo Bruce, Vince Kidd and Tyler James, and a performance by guest Tom Odell. Avril Lavigne and Beady Eye performed during the semi-final on 15 June. Michael Bublé and Dizzee Rascal featuring Robbie Williams performed on the final on 22 June 2013.

Results summary
Team’s colour key 
 Team Will
 Team Jessie
 Team Tom
 Team Danny

Result's colour key
 Artist given 'Fast Pass' by their coach and did not face the public vote
 Artist received the fewest votes and was eliminated 
 Artist received the most public votes

Live show details

Week 1: Quarter-final (7 June)
The first part aired from 7.00pm until 9.00pm and the second part from 9.30pm until 10.00pm.

After all three artists from each team had performed, the coach then had to decide which artist they want to give a "fast pass" to and put straight through to the semi-final. The voting lines for the remaining artists then opened after all twelve artists had performed.
Musical guests: Tyler James ("Worry About You"); Vince Kidd ("You & Me"); Bo Bruce ("Save Me"); Leanne Mitchell ("Pride"); Tom Odell ("Another Love")

Week 2: Semi-final (15 June)
This episode aired from 7.00pm until 9.10pm.

Group performances: The Voice UK Final 8 ("I Will Wait"); Team will.i.am with will.i.am ("Rapture"); Team Jessie with Jessie J ("Stay"); Team Tom with Tom Jones ("Games People Play"); Team Danny with Danny O'Donoghue ("Let Her Go")
Musical guests: Avril Lavigne ("Here's to Never Growing Up"); Beady Eye ("Second Bite of the Apple")

Week 3: Final (22 June)
This episode aired from 7.15pm until 9.25pm.

Group performance: The Voice UK Coaches ("Get Lucky")
Musical guests: Dizzee Rascal featuring Robbie Williams ("Goin' Crazy"); Michael Bublé ("Who's Lovin' You");

Reception

Ratings

The earlier shows averaged around 7.5 million viewers, before raising to around 9 million after 14 April once a substantial clash with Britain's Got Talent was avoided.

References

External links

 Official website

Series 02
2013 British television seasons